Gangneung Citizen FC is a South Korean Association football club based in the city of Gangneung. Currently Gangneung Citizen FC plays in the K3 League. In 2019 they became the final champions of the Korea National League before it was integrated into the K3 League.

Current team squad

2022 season squad

Honours

Domestic competitions

League
 National League
 Winners (2): 2009, 2019
 Runners-up (1): 2004

Cups
 National League Championship
 Runners-up (1): 2014
 National Sports Festival
 Gold Medal (2): 2007, 2012
 Silver Medal (1): 2003
 President's Cup
 Winners (1): 2009

Statistics

See also
List of football clubs in South Korea

References

External links
  Gangneung Citizen FC Official Website

 
Association football clubs established in 1999
Sport in Gangwon Province, South Korea
Sport in Gangneung
Korea National League clubs
1999 establishments in South Korea